Samrai is a census town in Jalandhar district of Punjab State, India. The village is administrated by a sarpanch who is an elected representative.

Transport 
Jalandhar railway station is the nearest train station however, Phagwara Junction train station is 16.5 km away from the village. The village is 55.3 km away from domestic airport in Ludhiana and the nearest international airport is located in Chandigarh also Sri Guru Ram Dass Jee International Airport is the second nearest airport which is (115.0 km) via NH3  away in Amritsar.

References 

Villages in Jalandhar district